December 32 may refer to:
 December 31, the last day of December
 32 dicembre, a 1988 Italian comedy film by Luciano De Crescenzo
 December 32, an album by Byul, or its title song
 32 Décembre, a volume of The Dormant Beast by Enki Bilal
 December 32, the date of Hogswatchnight in Hogfather by Terry Pratchett
 32nd December Love Error''(:th:32 ธันวา), a 2009 Thai film.
 December 32, 1980, day of LearFan's first flight

See also
 LearAvia Lear Fan
 List of non-standard dates

Date and time disambiguation pages